Third World Happy is a 2010 Philippine drama film directed by EJ Salcedo and starring Sam Milby and Jodi Sta. Maria as former partners. The film debuted 11 November 2010 at the Cinema One Originals Digital Film Festival, and had theatrical release across the Philippines on May 25, 2011.

Plot
Wesley (Sam Milby) was a Fil-Am and a naturalized citizen when he left Philippines 12 years earlier.  In America, he aspired to become a painter, and revealed that his parents died before he left the country to finish his dreams, he became a Fulbright scholar to achieve it.  Years later, he received a phone call that his loved one died and he was required to visit the wake. There he met his ex-girlfriend (Jodi Sta. Maria), his friends, his aunt and his own older brother will be his guide to give him a shining light and give him the courage to look at the coffin and say his last goodbyes. It is revealed that his Kuya Danny was the dead one after all.

Cast
 Sam Milby as Wesley
 Jodi Sta. Maria as Aylnn
 Melissa Mendez as Aunt Beth
 Archie Alemania as Lyndon
 Richard Quan as Danny
 Archie Adamos as Tiyong Boy
 Raul Morit as Mang Teng
 Geraldine Tan as Aylnn's Mother
 Eugene Herrera as Dexter

Accolades

 2010, Won Festival Prize for 'Best Supporting Actress' for Jodi Sta. Maria at Cinema One Originals Digital Film Festival
 2010, Nominated for Festival Prize as 'Best Picture' for EJ Salcedo at Cinema One Originals Digital Film Festival
 2011, Nominated for Gawad Urian Award for 'Best Actor' for Sam Milby at Gawad Urian Awards

References

External links
 

2010 films
2010 drama films
Filipino-language films
Philippine drama films
Philippine independent films
2010 independent films